Accelerator physics is a branch of applied physics, concerned with designing, building and operating particle accelerators. As such, it can be described  as the study of motion, manipulation and observation of relativistic charged particle beams and their interaction with accelerator structures by electromagnetic fields.

It is also related to other fields:
Microwave engineering (for acceleration/deflection structures in the radio frequency range).
Optics with an emphasis on geometrical optics (beam focusing and bending) and laser physics (laser-particle interaction).
Computer technology with an emphasis on digital signal processing; e.g., for automated manipulation of the particle beam.
Plasma physics, for the description of intense beams.

The experiments conducted with particle accelerators are not regarded as part of accelerator physics, but belong (according to the objectives of the experiments) to, e.g., particle physics, nuclear physics, condensed matter physics or materials physics. The types of experiments done at a particular accelerator facility are determined by characteristics of the generated particle beam such as average energy, particle type, intensity, and dimensions.

Acceleration and interaction of particles with RF structures

While it is possible to accelerate charged particles using electrostatic fields, like in a Cockcroft-Walton voltage multiplier, this method has limits given by electrical breakdown at high voltages. Furthermore, due to electrostatic fields being conservative, the maximum voltage limits the kinetic energy that is applicable to the particles.

To circumvent this problem, linear particle accelerators operate using time-varying fields. To control this fields using hollow macroscopic structures through which the particles are passing (wavelength restrictions), the frequency of such acceleration fields is located in the radio frequency region of the electromagnetic spectrum.

The space around a particle beam is evacuated to prevent scattering with gas atoms, requiring it to be enclosed in a vacuum chamber (or beam pipe). Due to the strong electromagnetic fields that follow the beam, it is possible for it to interact with any electrical impedance in the walls of the beam pipe. This may be in the form of a resistive impedance (i.e., the finite resistivity of the beam pipe material) or an inductive/capacitive impedance (due to the geometric changes in the beam pipe's cross section).

These impedances will induce wakefields (a strong warping of the electromagnetic field of the beam) that can interact with later particles. Since this interaction may have negative effects, it is studied to determine its magnitude, and to determine any actions that may be taken to mitigate it.

Beam dynamics

Due to the high velocity of the particles, and the resulting Lorentz force for magnetic fields, adjustments to the beam direction are mainly controlled by magnetostatic fields that deflect particles. In most accelerator concepts (excluding compact structures like the cyclotron or betatron), these are applied by dedicated electromagnets with different properties and functions.  An important step in the development of these types of accelerators was the understanding of strong focusing.  Dipole magnets are used to guide the beam through the structure, while quadrupole magnets are used for beam focusing, and sextupole magnets are used for correction of dispersion effects.

A particle on the exact design trajectory (or design orbit) of the accelerator only experiences dipole field components, while particles with transverse position deviation  are re-focused to the design orbit. For preliminary calculations, neglecting all fields components higher than quadrupolar, an inhomogenic Hill differential equation

can be used as an approximation, with
a non-constant focusing force , including strong focusing and weak focusing effects
the relative deviation from the design beam impulse 
the trajectory radius of curvature , and
the design path length ,
thus identifying the system as a parametric oscillator. Beam parameters for the accelerator can then be calculated using Ray transfer matrix analysis; e.g., a quadrupolar field is analogous to a lens in geometrical optics, having similar properties regarding beam focusing (but obeying Earnshaw's theorem).

The general equations of motion originate from relativistic Hamiltonian mechanics, in almost all cases using the Paraxial approximation. Even in the cases of strongly nonlinear magnetic fields, and without the paraxial approximation, a Lie transform may be used to construct an integrator with a high degree of accuracy.

Modeling Codes

There are many different software packages available for modeling the different aspects of accelerator physics.
One must model the elements that create the electric and magnetic fields, and then one must model the charged particle evolution within those fields.  A popular code for beam dynamics, designed by CERN is MAD, or Methodical Accelerator Design.

Beam diagnostics
A vital component of any accelerator are the diagnostic devices that allow various properties of the particle bunches to be measured.

A typical machine may use many different types of measurement device in order to measure different properties. These include (but are not limited to) Beam Position Monitors (BPMs) to measure the position of the bunch, screens (fluorescent screens, Optical Transition Radiation (OTR) devices) to image the profile of the bunch, wire-scanners to measure its cross-section, and toroids or ICTs to measure the bunch charge (i.e., the number of particles per bunch).

While many of these devices rely on well understood technology, designing a device capable of measuring a beam for a particular machine is a complex task requiring much expertise. Not only is a full understanding of the physics of the operation of the device necessary, but it is also necessary to ensure that the device is capable of measuring the expected parameters of the machine under consideration.

Success of the full range of beam diagnostics often underpins the success of the machine as a whole.

Machine tolerances
Errors in the alignment of components, field strength, etc., are inevitable in machines of this scale, so it is important to consider the tolerances under which a machine may operate.

Engineers will provide the physicists with expected tolerances for the alignment and manufacture of each component to allow full physics simulations of the expected behaviour of the machine under these conditions. In many cases it will be found that the performance is degraded to an unacceptable level, requiring either re-engineering of the components, or the invention of algorithms that allow the machine performance to be 'tuned' back to the design level.

This may require many simulations of different error conditions in order to determine the relative success of each tuning algorithm, and to allow recommendations for the collection of algorithms to be deployed on the real machine.

See also

 Particle accelerator
 Significant publications for accelerator physics
Category:Accelerator physics
Category:Accelerator physicists
Category:Particle accelerators

References

External links

United States Particle Accelerator School
UCB/LBL Beam Physics site
BNL page on The Alternating Gradient Concept

 
Experimental particle physics